The Iranian Space Research Center (ISRC, Persian:  Pazhoheshgah e Fazái e Irán) is a research center established by Iran's Ministry of Science, Research and Technology (Iran) in 2000 under the name Iran Aerospace Research Center to perform research in the field of aerospace. In 2010, the organization was renamed to its current name and the administration was transferred to the office of president.

The ISRC and Iranian Space Agency are the main organizations carrying space research and operations in Iran.

See also
 List of government space agencies

External links
Iranian Space Research Center 
Iranian Aerospace Research Center (The old website)

References

Space program of Iran
Research institutes in Iran
Science and technology in Iran
Scientific organisations based in Iran
Space agencies